Jackpot is the first album by the German singer, Pietro Lombardi, the winner of the eighth season of Deutschland sucht den Superstar. It was produced by the former member of Modern Talking, Dieter Bohlen, and released on 27 May 2011.

Singles
The first single from the album, "Call My Name", was released on 7 May 2011. It was the winning song on the eighth season of Deutschland sucht den Superstar. The song reached number one in Germany, Austria and Switzerland.

Track listing

Chart performance

Weekly charts

Year-end charts

Release history

References 

2011 debut albums
Pietro Lombardi (singer) albums